Žiče is a village in the Municipality of Slovenske Konjice in eastern Slovenia. It lies on the right bank of the Dravinja River near its confluence with Žičnica Creek, a minor right tributary that flows just south of the village. It is best known for the Žiče Charterhouse, a 12th-century monastery that is not actually in the settlement, but 6 km further up the valley of Žičnica Creek. The area is part of the traditional region of Styria. The municipality is now included in the Savinja Statistical Region.

Name
Žiče was attested in written sources in 1145 as Sietss (and as Siz in 1177, Seydes in 1184, and Seitz in 1185). The name is derived from the plural demonym *Zitъčane or *Žiťane, based on the hypocorism *Žitъko or *Žitъ, referring to an early inhabitant of the place. In the past it was known as Seitzdorf in German.

Church
The parish church in the settlement is dedicated to Saint Peter and belongs to the Roman Catholic Archdiocese of Maribor. It is a 14th-century church that was rebuilt in 1660.

Tourism 
 1998 The village won the European Entente Florale Bronze Medal Award.

References

External links
 
 Žiče at Geopedia

Populated places in the Municipality of Slovenske Konjice